{{DISPLAYTITLE:Kappa2 Sculptoris}}

Kappa2 Sculptoris, Latinized from κ2 Sculptoris, is a solitary, orange-hued star in the southern constellation of Sculptor. It is faintly visible to the naked eye, with a combined apparent visual magnitude of +5.42. Based upon an annual parallax shift of 4.11 mas as measured from Earth, it is located approximately 800 light years from the Sun.

This is an evolved K-type giant star with a stellar classification of K2 III. It is radiating 619 times the solar luminosity from its photosphere at an effective temperature of 4,160. There is a faint optical companion with visual magnitude 21.0 located at an angular separation of 44.2 arc seconds along a position angle of 289°, as of 2010.

References

K-type giants
Sculptoris, Kappa
Sculptor (constellation)
Durchmusterung objects
000720
000930
0034